KDTP, virtual and VHF digital channel 11, is a Daystar owned-and-operated television station licensed to Holbrook, Arizona, United States. The station is owned by Word of God Fellowship, a subsidiary of the Daystar Television Network. KDTP's offices are located in downtown Holbrook, and its transmitter is located northeast of the city.

Although KDTP is licensed as a full-power station, its broadcasting radius only covers the immediate Holbrook area. Therefore, it operates a low-powered translator station, KDPH-LD (channel 48) in Phoenix, which relays KDTP's programming to the Phoenix metropolitan area, as KDTP's signal is blocked by mountains and operates on only 3.2 kW.

History
An original construction permit for KDTP was issued on January 10, 2000 to Community Television Educators for a station to broadcast on channel 39, a non-commercial allocation in Phoenix. It replaced low-power K39BI (now KFPH-CD), which had been the local Daystar station, but had been moved to channel 35 and sold. The station was licensed on November 14, 2001, airing Daystar programming. In June 2006, the station was part of a facilities swap with KPHZ (now KTAZ), which moved the station from Phoenix channel 39 to Holbrook channel 11.

License swap
In 2004, NBC Telemundo, owner of a Class A LPTV station in Phoenix, KDRX-CA (now KDPH-LP), reached an agreement with KDTP that would allow the Telemundo network to secure a full-service station in order to compete on even terms with the leading Spanish-language station in town, Univision-owned KTVW-TV. NBC Telemundo would move its full-service station KPHZ channel 11 from Holbrook to Phoenix, taking the channel 39 allocation held by KDTP. In return, Daystar would move its full-service station KDTP channel 39 from Phoenix to Holbrook, taking the channel 11 allocation held by KPHZ. As compensation, NBC Telemundo would transfer KDRX-CA to Daystar, plus additional consideration, which turned out to be LPTV station KPHZ-LP (now KDTP-LP).

Complicating the issue was that KDTP was on a non-commercial reserved channel in Phoenix, and for the plan to go forward, the FCC would need to remove the non-commercial reservation from channel 39, something that it is extremely reluctant to do. Nevertheless, and in spite of Univision's objection, the FCC concluded that the addition of a competitive Spanish-language service outweighs the loss of a second non-commercial allocation, and approved of the plan  (text)  (PDF). By July 2006, the transfer was completed.

Digital television

The station's digital signal is multiplexed:

Programming
KDTP is an owned-and-operated station of the Daystar Television Network. Programming is generally Christian-themed, and is primarily taken from the network feed. On the weekends, KDTP broadcasts Spanish-language services from Phoenix-area churches.

External links
 Daystar Television Network
 FCC Predicted Coverage: KDTP-DT

References

DTP
Holbrook, Arizona
Mass media in Navajo County, Arizona
Daystar (TV network) affiliates
Religious television stations in the United States
Television channels and stations established in 2001
2001 establishments in Arizona